The Atlantic Sun is a local newspaper for the West Coast region of Cape Town, Western Cape, South Africa. An affiliate of Cape Community Newspapers, the newspaper does not have its own website, but the news is distributed via IOL.

References

Weekly newspapers published in South Africa
Mass media in Cape Town